Bayram Khwaja (Persian : بیرم خواجہ)(died 1380) was the founder of the Qara Qoyunlu, a Muslim Turkoman tribal confederation, that in a short space of time came to rule the territory comprising present-day Azerbaijan, Georgia, Armenia, northwestern Iran, eastern Turkey, and northeastern Iraq from about 1374 to 1468.

Family 
Bayram Khwaja was the son of Qara Mansur. He had a brother named Qara Dursun, whose son, Qara Mahammad, succeeded Bayram. He had two other brothers: Murad, was governor of Baghdad ; and Berdi Khwaja. He belonged to the Baranlu clan of the Yiva Oghuzes.

Biography
Bayram is first recorded in service to Huseyin beg, a Turkmen warlord who killed Pir Muhammed of Sinjar and usurped his city. Huseyin beg and his company were attacked by the Ayyubid lord of Hasankeyf, Al-Adil, in 1350; however, they defeated him. Bayram in turn usurped Huseyin Beg's position and declared his independence in 1351.

Bayram besieged Mardin, which at the time was ruled by the  Artuqid Mansur Ahmed, in 1366. Mansur called for Shaikh Awais Jalayir's help. Awais responded and defeated and subjugated Bayram Khwaja in a battle near Muş. He then besieged Mosul in 1371, but retreated on hearing news of the approach of a Mamluk force.

Bayram acted more independently after Awais' withdrawal. He subsequently invaded Mosul, Sinjar, Surmelu, Khoy and Nakhchivan in 1374. The new Jalairid sultan, Hussain, moved against Qara Mahammad and attacked Erciş, his new base. Despite Bayram's help, the Kara Koyunlus suffered heavy casualties and were subjugated in 1374, becoming vassals of the Jalairid Sultanate, which was centered in Baghdad and Tabriz.

Succession 
Bayram died in 1380 and was succeeded by his brother Berdi Khwaja, about whose reign nothing is known. He was followed by Qara Mahammad.

References

14th-century Turkic people
1380 deaths
Founding monarchs
Qara Qoyunlu rulers

ca:Bayram Khoja